Port of Azua is located in Azua Province, Dominican Republic.

Overview

Port of Azua was built in 1959 by Rafael Leonidas Trujillo.
The harbor has two terminals, one of those is utilized by Compañía de Gas Licuado de Petróleo Opuvisa (Petroleum Gas Company) which has installed containers of gas.

The other terminal is used for exportation of fruits (bananas), minerals and others, and occasionally general cargo operations are handled, too.

Port information

 Location: 
 Local time: UTC−4
 Weather/climate/prevailing winds:  From May 15 until September 15
 Climate: mostly sunny, tropical. Hurricane season runs from June to November
 Prevailing winds: direction ENE–ESE
 Average temperature range: 28–30 °C

See also 

 List of ports and harbours of the Atlantic Ocean

References 
 Azua Port (Spanish)

Azua
Urban planning in the Dominican Republic
Buildings and structures in Azua Province